Regina Pacis Catholic Secondary School (Regina Pacis CSS, RPCSS, Regina Pacis High, or Pacis in short) is a former Catholic secondary school in Toronto, Ontario, Canada. From 1980 to 2002, it was operated by the Toronto Catholic District School Board  serving the Downsview neighbourhood. The name Regina Pacis comes from Latin which means Queen of Peace, referring to the Virgin Mary.

History
Regina Pacis was founded in 1980 by Father Gerald Fitzgerald, CSSp and the Holy Ghost Fathers using the temporary facilities of St. Philip Neri Catholic School. The school moved to a newly built site on 45 Norfinch Drive that opened in 1982. Overcrowding pressures forced  the MSSB to lease the former Melody Public School on 24 Strathburn Blvd. from the North York Board of Education (which it was closed in 1986) along with half of 827 students from St. Basil-the-Great housed in 17 portables on the Weston Road site. 

As a result of declining enrollment in the years, the school was closed in June 2002. Pacis has a building in excellent state of repair, despite having a decrease in enrollment. Many of the students in area were redirected to schools such as St. Basil’s, James Cardinal McGuigan,  but renovations had to take place to accommodate the special needs students. With smaller school communities, many move to larger but physical buildings such as McGuigan, which previously had portables on site before added an annex in 2006.  St. Basil’s new building in the Humberlea area that can fit 984 students opened in 1999 has already outgrowned to 1450. 

Since its closure, Regina Pacis has been used by the school board as a holding school. For instance at first, the building served as the temporary home of Immaculate Conception Catholic School from 2003-2005 upon construction of the new, replacement campus on Comay Road. Similarly, Monsignor Percy Johnson Catholic Secondary School operated out of Pacis from 2005-2007 during construction with a two-year daily caravan of 13 buses and one late bus that would transport Johnson students to Pacis.  Since 2007, Monsignor Fraser College occupied the building, relocating from St. Gaspar to serve as the Norfinch Campus.

Today the facility hosts a number of surplus portable classrooms for schools west of Yonge Street.

Overview

Community
Regina Pacis is situated in the northwest quadrant of Downsview in North York with a mixed residential, commercial and industrial neighbourhood.

The feeder schools for Pacis were Blessed Margherita, St. Augustine, St. Charles Garnier, St. Francis de Sales and St. Jane Frances Catholic Schools. The local community was serviced by four closely situated churches: St. Augustine, St. Jane Frances, St. Jude and St. Wilfrid.

Campus
Regina Pacis is located in 5 acres of land with the new three storey building built in 1982. The school has 23 academic classrooms, three science labs, a wide atrium, two arts rooms, two music rooms, two industrial art rooms, a home economics room, a cafeteria with servery attached, a gymnatorium that can be partitioned into two smaller gyms with a stage, a chapel, and three staircases. The athletic field, Remberto Navia Sports Field is attached north of the school site.

See also
List of high schools in Ontario

References

External links
Regina Pacis Catholic Secondary School
Monsignor Fraser College

Educational institutions established in 1980
Educational institutions disestablished in 2002
High schools in Toronto
Catholic secondary schools in Ontario
Spiritan schools
Toronto Catholic District School Board
Relocated schools
1980 establishments in Ontario
2002 disestablishments in Ontario